Route 302 is a collector road in the Canadian province of Nova Scotia.

It is in Cumberland County and connects Amherst at Trunk 2 with Southampton at Trunk 2.  It is designated as part of the Fundy Shore Scenic Drive.

Communities
Southampton
South Athol
Athol
Maccan
Nappan

History

The entirety of Collector Highway 302 was originally part of and older westerly route of Trunk Highway 2, but was re-designated as Trunk Highway 2A when Trunk 2 was realigned. The route also intersected former Trunk 26 in Athol, now named Little Forks Road.

See also
List of Nova Scotia provincial highways

References

Nova Scotia provincial highways
Roads in Cumberland County, Nova Scotia